Michael Laitarovsky (born 15 August 1999) is an Israeli swimmer. He competed in the men's 100 metre backstroke at the 2020 Summer Olympics.

References

External links
 
 

1999 births
Living people
Competitors at the 2022 Maccabiah Games
Israeli male swimmers
Olympic swimmers of Israel
Swimmers at the 2020 Summer Olympics
Place of birth missing (living people)
20th-century Israeli people
21st-century Israeli people